John Conley was a member of the Wisconsin State Assembly.

Biography
Conley was born on December 26, 1828, in Three Rivers, Lower Canada. He later resided in Clinton, Wisconsin.

Career
Conley was a member of the Assembly during the 1882 and 1883 sessions. Additionally, he was a member of the town board of Clinton and the county board of Rock County, Wisconsin. He was a Republican.

References

Pre-Confederation Quebec people
People from Clinton, Rock County, Wisconsin
Wisconsin city council members
County supervisors in Wisconsin
Republican Party members of the Wisconsin State Assembly
1828 births
Year of death missing